The Acts of Shmona and of Gurya is a Syriac Christian martyrdom text. The setting takes place at Edessa during Roman Emperor Diocletian's Great Persecution.

Publications 
The martyrdom account of Shmona and Gurya was first only known in an abridged version written by Symeon the Metaphrast, then the Acts of Shmona and of Gurya was discovered on a Syriac manuscript. The manuscript was translated to English by Francis Crawford Burkitt in his Euphemia and the Goth with the Acts of Martyrdom of the Confessors of Edessa (Amsterdam, 1913).

Narrative overview 
The introduction of the text begins with mentioning names of current figures at the time in which the martyrdom began such as Diocletian, Aba, Bishop Qona, and Abgar son of Zora During the Diocletianic Persecution, the two martyrs dwelling in Edessa were compelled to worship the sun, but they refused to do so. An extensive discussion had occurred between the martyrs and the Eddessian governor Mysianus on why the two martyrs refused to worship the sun. They were killed after that.

Connection with other Syriac texts 

The Acts of Shmona and Gurya and the Martyrdom of Habib are claimed to be authored by a Theophilus who also claims to have witness their martyrdoms. Scholars agree that the Acts of Shmona and of Gurya are fairly historically reliable and record a martyrdom which took place around 297 AD. One scholar suggests that it was written in 309 or 310 AD. This makes the Acts one of the first Syriac hagiographies. It became a model for later, less historically reliable martyr stories such as the Acts of Sharbel and the Acts of Barsamya, which are widely regarded to be entirely fictitious. Sebastian Brock considers the Doctrine of Addai, the Acts of Sharbel, the Martyrdom of Barsamya came from the same group of authors.

There is a list unique to the Doctrine of Addai, which names Addai's first Christian converts who are of nobility; The list reoccurs in the Acts of Sharbel and the Martyrdom of Barsamya. The names can be found in former pagan regions of Edessa dating back to the fourth and third century AD and are rarely mentioned in Syriac sources from the fifth century AD and after. Sebastian Brock states that the names were probably genuine ancestral names of those who authored all three texts, however, he doubts their conversion to Christianity. Further, he states the names mentioned in the Martyrdom of Barsmaya and the Acts of Sharbel imitated literary writing styles from that of the Martyrdom of Habib and the Acts of Shmona and Gurya. With such a connection, Brock concludes the authors of the Acts of Shabrel and the Martyrdom of Barsamya were incorporating the ideal that their pagan ancestors had converted to Christianity, or they had a martyr prior to Shmona, Gurya, and Habib.

Evidence of the martyrs 
The historicity of the text is considered reliable. Shmona and Gurya were reported to be buried at a place called "Beth Alah Qiqla". Relics of the two martyrs were found in Edessa, and Ephrem the Syrian mentions the martyrs in his Carmina Nisibena. The names of the two martyrs are also written on a Syriac calendar manuscript from 411 AD which lists names of martyrs from Edessa, and their names are written in the Menologion of Basil II.

Notes

Citations

Sources 

 
  reprinted in

Further reading 

 
 
 
  The Syriac-Armenian version is given here in German translation only. The Syriac texts, including the "Thauma" (i.e. the story of the miracle performed by the three martyrs for the benefit of Euphemia, known to V. Dobschütz in its Greek version only) were published together with an English translation by F.C. Burkitt under title: Euphemia and the Goth; with the Acts of martyrdom of the confessors of Edessa. . Pub. for the Text and translation society, London, 1913.

External links 
 Martyrdom Of The Holy Confessors Shamuna, Guria And Habib From Simeon Metaphrases. English translation by B. P. Pratten from The Ante-Nicene Fathers: Translations Of The Writings of the Fathers down to A.D. 325, Volume VIII. (New York, 1871)

Syriac Christianity
3rd-century Christian martyrs
4th-century Christian texts
Christian hagiography
History of Christianity in Syria
Edessa
Texts in Syriac
Diocletianic Persecution
Works set in the 4th century